Five is the fifth Japanese studio album by South Korean boy band Shinee. It was released digitally on January 27, 2017 by Universal Music Japan sub label EMI Records, while the physical edition was released on February 22, 2017. The album debuted at number three on Oricon weekly chart, selling 68,102 copies. It was awarded in the Best 3 Albums (Asia) category at the 32nd Japan Gold Disc Award.

This was Shinee's last original release to feature Jonghyun in his lifetime before his death on December 18, 2017.

Promotion
To promote the album, Shinee embarked on their fifth Japan tour, Shinee World 2017. The tour kicked off in Fukui on January 28, 2017 and ended in Tokyo on April 30, 2017, with a total of 25 concerts in 10 cities.

Track listing

Charts

Weekly charts

Monthly charts

Year-end charts

References

Shinee albums
SM Entertainment albums
EMI Records albums
Universal Music Japan albums
2017 albums
Japanese-language albums